Next Generation  was a video game magazine that was published by Imagine Media (now Future US). It was affiliated to and shared editorial with the UK's Edge magazine. Next Generation ran from January 1995 until January 2002. It was published by Jonathan Simpson-Bint and edited by Neil West. Other editors included Chris Charla, Tom Russo, and Blake Fischer.

Next Generation initially covered the 32-bit consoles including 3DO, Atari Jaguar, and the then-still unreleased Sony PlayStation and Sega Saturn. Unlike competitors GamePro and Electronic Gaming Monthly, the magazine was directed towards a different readership by focusing on the industry itself rather than individual games.

Publication history
The magazine was first published by GP Publications up until May 1995 when the publisher rebranded as Imagine Media.

In September 1999, Next Generation was redesigned, its cover name shortened to simply NextGen. This would start what was known as "Lifecycle 2" of the magazine. A year later, in September 2000, the magazine's width was increased from its standard 8 inches to 9 inches, however this wider format lasted less than a year. Subscribers of Next-Gen Magazine received issues of PlayStation Magazine when the magazine's life-cycle was terminated.

The brand was resurrected in 2005 by Future Publishing USA as an industry-led website, Next-Gen.biz. It carries much the same articles and editorial as the print magazine, and in fact reprints many articles from Edge, the UK-based sister magazine to Next-Gen.
In July 2008, Next-Gen.biz was rebranded as Edge-Online.com.

Content
Next Generation'''s content didn't focus on screenshots, walkthroughs, and cheat codes. Instead the content was more focused on game development from an artistic perspective. Interviews with people in the video game industry often featured questions about gaming in general rather than about the details of the latest game or game system they were working on.Next Generation was first published prior to the North American launch of the Sega Saturn and Sony PlayStation, and much of the early content was in anticipation of those consoles.

Apart from the regular columns, the magazine did not use bylines. The editors explained that they felt the magazine's entire staff should share the credit or responsibility for each article and review, even those written by individuals.

The review ranking system was based on a number of stars (1 through 5) that ranked games based on their merits overall compared to what games were already out there.Next Generation had a few editorial sections like "The Way Games Ought To Be" (originally written every month by game designer Chris Crawford) that would attempt to provide constructive criticism on standard practices in the video game industry.

The magazine's construction and design was decidedly simple and clean, its back cover having no advertising on it initially, a departure from most other gaming magazines. The first several years of Next Generation'' had a heavy matte laminated finish cover stock, unlike the glossy paper covers of its competitors. The magazine moved away from this cover style in early 1999, only for it to return again in late 2000.

Issue history

References

External links
Complete collection of 85 front-cover images Next Generation
Wayback link for Next Generation Online
Wayback link for Imagine Publishing
Archived Next Generation Magazines on the Internet Archive
Archived Next Generation Magazines on Retro CDN

1995 establishments in California
2002 disestablishments in California
Monthly magazines published in the United States
Video game magazines published in the United States
Defunct computer magazines published in the United States
Magazines disestablished in 2002
Magazines established in 1995
Magazines published in California